The  (English translation: 'Children's Symphony') is a three-movement composition for chamber orchestra by the Finnish composer Uuno Klami, who wrote the piece in 1928 (and possibly into 1929). Toivo Haapanen and the Helsinki Philharmonic Orchestra premiered the work at the University of Helsinki on 14 December 1931, during Klami's "highly-acclaimed" second composition concert. Symphonic in name rather than in technique, the Symphonie enfantine is the first of Klami's three symphonies and the only of the series to not receive a number: the First Symphony arrived subsequently in 1938 and the Second Symphony (Op. 35) in 1945.

History 
During its premiere it shared the program with the Tšeremissiläinen fantasia (Cheremissian Fantasy), a concertante piece for cello and orchestra (Op. 19, 1931; cellist Ossian Fohström), as well as 3 Bf from the orchestral suite Merikuvia (Sea Pictures) (then still in progress; 1930–32) and the concert waltz Opernredoute (Op. 20, 1929).

Orchestration 
The Symphonie enfantine is scored for a "petit orchestra" that includes the following instruments:
Woodwind: flute, oboe, cor anglais, clarinet, and bassoon
Brass: horn and trumpet
Percussion: timpani and tambourine
Strings: 12 violins, 7 violas, 3 cellos, 3 double basses, and harp

Structure 

The Symphonie enfantine is in three movements. They are as follows:

Discography 
The sortable table below lists the three commercially available recordings of the Symphonie enfantine:

Notes, references, and sources

Notes

References

Sources 

 
 

 

Compositions by Uuno Klami
1928 compositions